The Voltaire Falls (French: Chutes Voltaire) is a series of waterfalls in the Voltaire Creek in French Guiana, France. The Voltaire Falls are the largest waterfalls in French Guiana. It is a protected area since 2000.

Overview
The Voltaire Creek is sourced from the Voltaire Inselberg. Downstream, the creek encounters hard granite rock, causing the creek to split in two parts that descend 35 metres in a steep slope of up to 40%. About 200 metres later, the two parts rejoin, confluence with the Sparouine Creek and continue onto the Maroni River. The left arm is the widest, however the right arm offers a more impressive view.

An area of  containing the Voltaire Falls and the neighbouring Vieux Broussard Falls have been protected since 2000. The area is also important for its flora and fauna.

Transport
In 1990, a trail was built to access the falls by car, however a four-wheel drive vehicle is recommended. The distance from Saint-Laurent-du-Maroni is about 70 kilometres. The falls can be reached by taking the road to Saint-Jean-du-Maroni, and then taking the trail to Paul Isnard.

References

Protected areas of French Guiana
Saint-Laurent-du-Maroni
Tourist attractions in French Guiana
Waterfalls of French Guiana